Vanand is an area of historic Armenia.

Vanand may also refer to the following places:

 Vanand, Armavir, Armenia
 Vanand, Syunik, Armenia
 Vanand, Ordubad, Azerbaijan
 Vanand, Maharashtra, India
 Vanand Peak, Antarctica

See also
 Vananda